Arvonne Fraser Library (formerly the Southeast Library) is a public library in Minneapolis, serving the University community.  Designed by Ralph Rapson and built in 1963, the library is an example of brutalist architecture.  The building originally housed a credit union for state and university employees before a 1967 repurposing, when it became the Southeast Library.  Following a subsequent renovation from 2018 to 2020, the library was renamed after Arvonne Fraser, a women's rights advocate and political campaigner.

The library was preceded by several related historical libraries, which occupied other sites throughout the area.  These included branches established under the leadership of Gratia Countryman, chief librarian of the Minneapolis Public Library from 1904 to 1936.

Predecessors

The Arvonne Fraser library was preceded by several others serving the same community.

East Side Branch, 1891–1904
The third branch of the Minneapolis Public library opened on November 1, 1891 in the old Winthrop School building at 22 University Avenue Southeast. It was replaced by the Pillsbury Library in 1904.

Pillsbury Library, 1904–1967
John Sargent Pillsbury, Minnesota's eighth governor, offered to build a branch library at the corner of University and Central Avenues in old St. Anthony (later East Minneapolis). The location was a few blocks from the iconic Pillsbury "A" Mill and close to the governor's home.  Although Pillsbury died before the library opened in April, 1904, the family carried out the gift.  One of the most beautiful library branches in Minneapolis, the library was built out of marble and featured mahogany inside. In 1960 a new Central Library opened right across the river from the Pillsbury Library so a location closer to the University Community's core was sought.  The Southeast Library replaced the Pillsbury Library in 1967.

Located at 100 University Avenue Southeast, after many years as the Dolly Fiterman gallery, the Pillsbury Library more recently housed the Phillips Foundation.

Seven Corners Library, 1906-1964
A successful delivery station was replaced in 1906 by the Seven Corners Branch in a rented space at 231 Cedar Avenue. The Seven Corners (Cedar-Riverside) area was teeming with new immigrants and the library was quite busy. A permanent Seven Corners branch was built at 300 15th Ave. South in 1912. By 1964 the library's circulation numbers paled in comparison to its first decades of existence. The building was sold to the Minnesota Department of Transportation and was razed for highway construction.

Southeast Library, 1967-2018
In 1960, architect Ralph Rapson was asked to design a university-area building for the State Capitol Credit Union, a banking organization serving university and state employees.  Sited at 1222 Fourth Street Southeast, the building was purchased for conversion to a library on December 29, 1966.  The building reopened as the Southeast Library on December 26, 1967.

The library's most notable feature is its square concrete roof, 100 feet on each side.  Seen from below, the ceiling is divided into a "waffle-like" form, a 32x32 grid of 1024 cells.  This canopy is supported by 16 evenly-spaced pillars and is dotted by 22 skylights—three central 2x2 lights, and 19 smaller 1x1 lights.

Southeast Library and 14 other libraries of Minneapolis Public Library were merged into the combined urban/suburban Hennepin County Library in 2008.

Arvonne Fraser Library, 2019-present
On December 10, 2018, the library closed for a year-long, $11.6 million renovation.  The next day, the Hennepin County Board of Commissioners voted to rename the library after Fraser.  Following completion of the renovation, the Arvonne Fraser Library reopened on Saturday January 25, 2020.  The renovation doubled the library's square footage by improving a disused basement space, which houses inventory and a children's area.  To connect the two floors and to allow natural light into the windowless basement space, an opening was cut in the center of the ground level.

References

Brutalist architecture in Minnesota
Minneapolis Public Library
Hennepin County Library
Library buildings completed in 1967
Libraries in Minnesota